Christopher Storer is an American film producer, director and writer known for The Bear, Ramy, Eighth Grade, and the Peabody Award-winning Netflix special Hasan Minhaj: Homecoming King.

Filmography

Television

References

External links 
IMDB Page

American film producers
Living people
Year of birth missing (living people)
American film directors
American screenwriters
Place of birth missing (living people)